
Helianthushof was a restaurant in Uden, in the Netherlands. It was a fine dining restaurant that was awarded one Michelin star in 1998 and retained that rating until 2001.

Owner and head chef of Helianthushof was Jannis Brevet.

The restaurant lost its star in 2002, due to Brevet selling the restaurant in 2001 to take over Inter Scaldes in Kruiningen.

See also
List of Michelin starred restaurants in the Netherlands

References 

Restaurants in the Netherlands
Michelin Guide starred restaurants in the Netherlands
Defunct restaurants in the Netherlands
Restaurants in North Brabant
Maashorst